Palais des sports Marcel-Cerdan is a multi-purpose indoor sports arena that is located in Levallois, Paris, France. It is primarily used to host basketball games. The arena is named after the French boxer Marcel Cerdan. The arena has a seating capacity of 4,000.

History
The arena was originally opened in 1992. It has been used as the home arena of the French League basketball clubs Paris BR, Levallois Sporting Club, and Metropolitans 92.

References

External links
Palais des sports Marcel-Cerdan 
PALAIS DES SPORTS MARCEL - CERDAN 

Basketball venues in France
Indoor arenas in France
Sports venues in Hauts-de-Seine